Ganga Dussehra, also known as Gangavataran, is a Hindu festival celebrating the avatarana (descent) of the Ganges. It is believed by Hindus that the holy river Ganges descended from heaven to earth on this day. Ganga Dussehra takes place on Dashami (10th day) of the waxing moon (Shukla Paksha) of the Hindu calendar month Jyeshtha. The festival celebration lasts ten days, including the nine days preceding this holy day.

Celebration

Ganga Dussehra is observed by Hindus mainly in the states of Uttar Pradesh, Uttarakhand, Bihar, and West Bengal, where the river flows. Haridwar, Varanasi, Garhmukteshwar, Rishikesh, Allahabad, and Patna are the main locations of the celebrations, where devotees gather at the banks of the Ganges and perform aartis (a religious ritual in which a light lamp is moved clockwise circularly in front of a deity as a part of prayer) to the river. Taking a dip in the river on this day is believed to bring the devotee to a state of purification and also heal any physical ailments he may have. In Sanskrit, dasha means ten and hara means destroy; thus bathing in the river during these ten days is believed to rid the person of ten sins or, alternatively, ten lifetimes of sins.

On the same day, the river Yamuna is also worshipped and kite-flying events are organized. Devotees take a holy dip in the Yamuna at places like Mathura, Vrindavan, and Bateshwar, and give offerings of watermelon and cucumber. They distribute drinks such as lassi, sharbat and shikanji.

In 2017, an estimated 15 lakh people celebrated the festival in Haridwar. At the Dashashwamedh Ghat in Varanasi, several rituals such as deep daan (offering of floating diyas to the river) and maha aarti are conducted. In Patna, a grand aarti is performed in the evening by priests at Gandhi Ghat and an 1100m garland is offered to the river at Adalat Ghat.

See also
 Ganga puja

References

Hindu holy days
Religious festivals in India